I Say Yes is the debut album by American recording artist Jessica Sutta. It was released on March 3, 2017 by Premier League Music.

Background 
After leaving The Pussycat Dolls, Sutta released several solo singles, including "Show Me", which reached number 1 on the Billboard Dance Club Charts. She was signed to Hollywood Records. In 2011, she began working on her debut solo album, Sutta Pop, but was shelved, and she left the label.

In 2016, Sutta released her mixtape Feline Resurrection, composed of discards from I Say Yes, via Premier League Music. She released one new song from the mixtape for free download every Friday from April 8 to June 9, 2016, starting with the first track "I Tried" with a total of 17 tracks.

Singles 
"Forever" is the lead single from the album. It was released on March 12, 2016 with a video releasing on Sutta's channel on March 21, 2016.

"Distortion" was released as the second single from the album on September 23, 2016. The music video followed almost two months later on November 4, 2016. The song peaked at number 1 on US Dance Club Songs chart.

"Feel Like Making Love" was released as a single on March 16, 2017. The music video dropped on the same day. It is possible that the song did not chart in the US or the UK.

Promotional singles 
Sutta released "When a Girl Loves a Boy" featuring Pitbull as a promotional single in early 2017.

Track listing

Personnel 
Executive producers – Mams Taylor and Rico Love
A&R – Mams Taylor and Martin Garza
Mastering – Henkka Niemistö, Chartmakers Mastering East
Recording engineers – Jaime Velez ; John Shullman ; Dave Audé 
Mixing – Michalis "MsM" Michael, The Code, Christian Dwiggins, Dave Audé and Dave Pensado
Artwork – Chadwickman
Photography – Paige Craig and Martin Haussler

References

2017 debut albums
Self-released albums